The 2022 North America and Caribbean Women's Junior Handball Championship was the first edition of the tournament, it took place in Mexico City, Mexico, from 4 to 8 April 2022. It acted as the North America and Caribbean qualifying tournament for the 2022 Women's Junior World Handball Championship.

Preliminary round

Standings

Results
All times are local (UTC–5).

Knockout stage

Third place game

Final

See also
 Nor.Ca. Women's Handball Championship

Weblinks 
 Page by USA Team Handball

References

North America and Caribbeann Junior
International handball competitions hosted by Mexico
North America
Sports competitions in Mexico City
North America